Bostra mesoleucalis is a species of snout moth in the genus Bostra described by George Hampson in 1912.

It is found in Sri Lanka  and India.

This species has a wingspan of 20 mm.

References

Pyralini
Moths of Asia
Moths described in 1912